Reinhard Zahn is a German coxswain who competed for the SC Dynamo Berlin / Sportvereinigung (SV) Dynamo. He won medals at the international rowing competitions.

References

External links
 

German male rowers
Year of birth missing (living people)
Living people
World Rowing Championships medalists for East Germany
Coxswains (rowing)
European Rowing Championships medalists